Charles Jacob "Jake" Hamilton (born April 15, 1979) is an American Christian praise & worship singer and songwriter. Hamilton released the album entitled Marked By Heaven in 2009, which was his first full-length live album. This was followed by his second live album 2011's Freedom Calling, which saw commercial successes via the Billboard charts. In 2014, Hamilton started a band called Jake Hamilton & the Sound, and they released Beautiful Rider.

Background
Hamilton was born Charles Jacob Hamilton on April 15, 1979 in Rancho Cucamonga, California to mother Catherine and father Charles. Hamilton has two younger brothers.

Career
Hamilton started as a recording artist in 2009 with his first live album Marked By Heaven on the Jesus Culture Music and Kingsway labels. His second live project was Freedom Calling in 2011 released by Jesus Culture Music and Kingsway, and this received commercial successes. In 2014, Hamilton started a band called Jake Hamilton & the Sound releasing their first album entitled Beautiful Rider that has received commercial successes and positive criticism.

Discography

Studio albums

References

External links
 

1979 births
Living people
American performers of Christian music
Singers from California
People from Rancho Cucamonga, California
Songwriters from California
21st-century American singers
21st-century American male singers
American male songwriters